Mike Boland is an American politician who served in the Illinois House of Representatives, representing the 71st District from 1995 to 2010, and the Democratic nominee for Indiana State Treasurer in 2014.

Born on August 20, 1942, Mike was born and spent part of his childhood in Davenport, Iowa as one of seven children.  His family moved to Texas; Boland returned to the Quad Cities area to finish the final two years of high school.

He received his B.A. from Upper Iowa University and his M.S. in education from Henderson State University;  he had, from Western Illinois University and the University of Iowa, 48 semester hours of work past his master's degree.  Boland spent thirty years as a civics teacher.

Boland's wife, Mary, is a member of the Illinois State Democratic Central Committee from Illinois's 17th congressional district.  Mike and Mary have two daughters.

, Boland lived in East Moline, Illinois.

Political life
Boland was in the Illinois House of Representatives for 16 years.

He was one of the most forceful voices concerning the admissions controversy at the University of Illinois, in which relatives of politicians close to ex-governor Rod Blagojevich were being admitted more easily by university officials.  Boland called on university officials, including B. Joseph White, to resign, saying "They were trusted to protect our university. In my eyes, they failed in that regard and they should resign."

He left the Illinois House of Representatives to run for Lieutenant Governor of Illinois in 2010, but was defeated.

In June 2011, Mike Boland announced that he was running for the Democratic nomination for 17th district congressman, which would then go up against the Republican freshman U.S. Representative Bobby Schilling.  Other competitors in the race at that time included Illinois State Senator David Koehler of Peoria; East Moline City Councilwoman Cheri Bustos, Freeport Mayor George Gaulrapp, and Quad Cities immigration lawyer Eric Reyes.  However, in October 2011, Boland dropped out of the Congressional race to run instead against incumbent Mike Jacobs for the Democratic nomination for Illinois State Senate in the 36th Legislative District.

References

External links
Mike Boland for Illinois State Senate 36th District — official 2012 campaign site
Illinois General Assembly - Representative Mike Boland (D) 71st District official IL House website
Bills Committees
Project Vote Smart - Representative Michael J. 'Mike' Boland (IL) profile
Follow the Money - Mike Boland
2006 2004 2002 2000 1998 1996 campaign contributions
Illinois House Democrats - Mike Boland profile

1942 births
Living people
Schoolteachers from Illinois
Henderson State University alumni
Democratic Party members of the Illinois House of Representatives
Politicians from Davenport, Iowa
People from East Moline, Illinois
Upper Iowa University alumni
People from Fishers, Indiana
21st-century American politicians